Juni Marie Benjaminsen (born 21 March 1999) is a Norwegian former competitive figure skater. In 2015, she became the first Norwegian ladies' skater in 16 years to advance to the free skate at the World Junior Championships. She has competed in the final segment at two editions.

Personal life
Juni Marie Benjaminsen was born on 21 March 1999 in Oslo, Norway. Her parents are Finnish orienteer Anne Benjaminsen and Norwegian orienteer Vidar Benjaminsen. Orienteer Andrine Benjaminsen is her sister.

Career

Early career
Benjaminsen started skating in 2004 at Oslo Skøiteklub. Benjaminsen won the Norwegian novice ladies' title during the 2012–13 season. The following season, she competed on the junior level, placing 10th at the 2014 Nordic Championships.

2014–2015 season
Benjaminsen made her ISU Junior Grand Prix (JGP) debut in the 2014–15 season, placing 19th in Courchevel and 23rd in Tallinn. She placed 5th in junior ladies at the Tallinn Trophy, took the junior bronze medal at the 2015 Nordic Championships, and finished 13th at the 2015 European Youth Olympic Festival (EYOF). At the 2015 World Junior Championships in Tallinn, she scored her personal best in the short program and advanced to the final, finishing 22nd overall. She was the first Norwegian in 16 years to qualify for the ladies' free skate at a World Junior Championships.

2015–2016 season
During summer 2015 she trained in Oberstdorf, Germany and Richmond, Virginia, United States. Benjaminsen began her season on the JGP series, placing 16th in Latvia and 14th in Spain. In Riga, Latvia, she became the first Norwegian woman to have successfully landed a triple-triple combination in competition. Making her senior international debut, she finished 12th at an ISU Challenger Series (CS) event in November, the 2015 Tallinn Trophy. She won the silver medal at the 2016 Norwegian Junior Championships, and placed 6th at the 2016 Nordics after winning the short program. At the 2016 Junior Worlds she advanced to the final placing 20th in the short program, and finished 22nd overall.

2016–2017 season
Benjaminsen competed in Slovenia and Germany in the JGP season. She competed in the senior category for the first time at the 2017 Norwegian Championships, taking silver behind Jemima Rasmuss. She also competed at the 2017 Junior Worlds, but did not advance to the free skate. She announced her retirement from competitive skating on 10 May 2017.

Programs

Competitive highlights 
CS: Challenger Series; JGP: Junior Grand Prix

References

External links 
 
 

1999 births
Sportspeople from Oslo
Norwegian female single skaters
Living people
Figure skaters at the 2016 Winter Youth Olympics
Norwegian people of Finnish descent
21st-century Norwegian women